At the 23rd edition of the annual Four Hills Tournament, Willi Pürstl became the first Austrian tour winner since Sepp Bradl, who won the inaugural tournament.

Karl Schnabl, who only placed 35th (170.5 pts) in Oberstdorf, became the third person within five years to win three out of four events and still fail to win the tournament.

Participating nations and athletes

Results

Oberstdorf
 Schattenbergschanze, Oberstdorf
29 December 1974

Garmisch-Partenkirchen
 Große Olympiaschanze, Garmisch-Partenkirchen
1 January 1975

Innsbruck
 Bergiselschanze, Innsbruck
3 January 1975

Bischofshofen
 Paul-Ausserleitner-Schanze, Bischofshofen
6 January 1975

Final ranking

References

External links
 FIS website
 Four Hills Tournament web site

Four Hills Tournament
1974 in ski jumping
1975 in ski jumping